Dysart Burghs was a district of burghs constituency of the House of Commons of Great Britain (at Westminster) from 1708 to 1801 and of the House of Commons of the United Kingdom (also at Westminster) from 1801 to 1832. It elected one Member of Parliament (MP).

Creation
The British parliamentary constituency was created in 1708 following the Acts of Union, 1707 and replaced the former Parliament of Scotland burgh constituencies of Burntisland, Dysart, Kinghorn and Kirkcaldy.

Boundaries 

The constituency consisted of the burghs of Burntisland, Dysart, Kinghorn and Kirkcaldy, all in the county of Fife. It had just four voters, the commissioners elected by the four burgh councils. The place of election rotated between the burghs and the host burgh had a casting vote if there was a tie.

History
The constituency elected one Member of Parliament (MP) by the first past the post system until  1832.

For the 1832 general election, under the Representation of the People (Scotland) Act 1832, the constituency was renamed Kirkcaldy Burghs, the boundaries of the burghs for parliamentary purposes ceased to be those for other purposes, and the voting system was changed.

Members of Parliament

Elections 

The first election in Dysart Burghs was in 1708. In 1707–08, members of the 1702–1707 Parliament of Scotland were co-opted to serve in the 1st Parliament of Great Britain. See Scottish representatives to the 1st Parliament of Great Britain for further details.

The most populous of the burghs was Kirkcaldy. The Oswald family became the dominant force in Kirkcaldy politics in the 18th century.

The second largest burgh was Dysart, controlled by the St. Clair interest.

Burntisland and Kinghorn were smaller. The votes from these burghs seem to have been available to the highest bidder.

The combined Oswald and St. Clair influence often decided who was to be elected, but in 1774 a rich outsider bribed his way into Parliament, to the surprise of the incumbent J.T. Oswald.

The most prominent political figure, during the time he represented the constituency, was the second James Oswald. He was seen as a reliable man of business and held a number of junior ministerial offices. At one point he was even being thought of as a possible Chancellor of the Exchequer, but being Scottish counted against Oswald. The Prime Minister, the Earl of Bute was extremely unpopular with English opinion in the early 1760s, so promoting another Scot was thought too risky.

Sir James St.Clair-Erskine (MP 1796–1805) was more important later in his career when in 1834–35, as 2nd Earl of Rosslyn, he served as Lord President of the Council.

 1708 (26 May) general election (election at Dysart)
 Hon. John Sinclair: Unopposed
 Declared incapable of being elected, being the eldest son of Lord Sinclair
 1710 (16 January) by-election (election at Dysart)
 James Abercromby possibly defeated William Patterson, no vote totals available (see note below)
 1710 (31 October) general election (election at Kirkcaldy)
 James Oswald: Unopposed
 1713 general election (election at Burntisland)
 James Oswald: Unopposed
 1715 (17 February) general election (election at Kinghorn)
 William Kerr: Unopposed
 1722 (14 April) general election (election at Dysart)
 Thomas Leslie defeated James St Clair, no vote totals available. On petition St.Clair was awarded the seat.
 1727 general election (election at Kirkcaldy)
 James St Clair: Unopposed
 1734 (20 May) general election (election at Burntisland)
 Hon. Thomas Leslie defeated James St Clair, no vote totals available.
 1741 (2 June) general election (election at Kinghorn)
 James Oswald: Unopposed
 Appointed a Commissioner of the Admiralty
 1745 (January) by-election (election at Kinghorn)
 James Oswald: Unopposed
 1747 (23 July) general election (election at Dysart)
 James St Clair: Unopposed
 1754 (11 May) general election (election at Kirkcaldy)
 James Oswald: Unopposed
 Appointed a Commissioner of the Treasury
 1760 (18 January) by-election (election at Kirkcaldy)
 James Oswald: Unopposed
 1761 (20 April) general election (election at Burntisland)
 James Oswald: Unopposed
 Appointed a Vice Treasurer of Ireland
 1763 (18 May) by-election (election at Burntisland)
 James Oswald: Unopposed
 1768 (11 April) general election (election at Kinghorn)
 James Townshend Oswald: Unopposed
 Appointed Secretary for the Leeward Islands
 1772 (28 February) by-election (election at Kinghorn)
 James Townshend Oswald: Unopposed
 1774 (1 November) general election (election at Dysart)
 John Johnstone: 3 votes (Burntisland, Dysart and Kinghorn)
 James Townshend Oswald: 1 vote (Kirkcaldy)
 1780 (3 October) general election (election at Kirkcaldy)
 John Henderson: 2 votes (Burntisland and Kirkcaldy)
 John Johnstone: 2 votes (Dysart and Kinghorn)
 Kirkcaldy used its casting vote to elect Henderson
 1784 (26 April) general election (election at Burntisland)
 Sir Charles Preston: Unopposed
 1790 (12 July) general election (election at Kinghorn)
 Hon. Charles Hope: 2 votes
 John Crauford: 2 votes
 Kinghorn used its casting vote to elect Hope
 1796 (21 June) general election (election at Dysart)
 Sir James St Clair-Erskine, Bt: Unopposed
 1802 general election (election at Kirkcaldy)
 Sir James St Clair-Erskine, Bt: Unopposed
 Succeeded to the Peerage as Earl of Rosslyn
 1805 (4 March) by-election (election at Kirkcaldy)
 Robert M. Dallas: Unopposed
 1806 (25 November) general election (election at Burntisland)
 Ronald Crauford Ferguson (Whig): Unopposed
 1807 general election (election at Kinghorn)
 Ronald Crauford Ferguson (Whig): Unopposed
 1812 general election (election at Dysart)
 Ronald Crauford Ferguson (Whig) 3 votes
 P.C.C.H. Durham (Tory) 1 vote
 1818 general election (election at Kirkcaldy)
 Sir Ronald Crauford Ferguson (Whig): Unopposed
 1820 general election (election at Burntisland)
 Sir Ronald Crauford Ferguson (Whig): Unopposed
 1826 general election (election at Kinghorn)
 Sir Ronald Crauford Ferguson (Whig): Unopposed
 1830 (23 August) general election (election at Dysart)
 Lord Loughborough (Tory): Unopposed
 1831 (26 May) general election (election at Kirkcaldy)
 Robert Ferguson (Whig): Unopposed

Note:
Stooks Smith refers to a by-election in December 1709, won by Patterson but does not mention Abercromby. Leigh Rayment's site does not mention Patterson, but has James Abercromby as MP from 16 January 1710. Possibly there was an undocumented contested election.

References
The Parliaments of England by Henry Stooks Smith (1st edition published in three volumes 1844–50), 2nd edition edited (in one volume) by F.W.S. Craig (Political Reference Publications 1973)
House of Commons 1754–1790, by Sir Lewis Namier and John Brooke (Secker and Warburg 1964)

Historic parliamentary constituencies in Scotland (Westminster)
Constituencies of the Parliament of the United Kingdom established in 1708
Constituencies of the Parliament of the United Kingdom disestablished in 1832